Posnet Omony (born 7 December 1982) is a Ugandan football goalkeeper for South African National First Division club Roses United.

External links

1982 births
Sportspeople from Kampala
Ugandan footballers
Ugandan expatriate footballers
Uganda international footballers
Living people
Ugandan expatriate sportspeople in South Africa
SC Villa players
Association football goalkeepers
Bloemfontein Celtic F.C. players
Expatriate soccer players in South Africa
Black Leopards F.C. players
Vasco da Gama (South Africa) players
Roses United F.C. players